Cocozza is a surname. Notable people with the surname include:

 Alfred Arnold Cocozza (1921–1959), stage name Mario Lanza, American tenor, actor and Hollywood film star
 Enrico Cocozza (1921–2009), Scottish filmmaker
 Frankie Cocozza (born 1993), English singer who participated in The X Factor in 2011
 Marc Cocozza (born 1981), Scottish footballer